Events in the year 1969 in Bulgaria.

Incumbents 

 General Secretaries of the Bulgarian Communist Party: Todor Zhivkov
 Chairmen of the Council of Ministers: Todor Zhivkov

Events 

 The Bulgarian drama film Tango, directed by Vasil Mirchev, entered into the 6th Moscow International Film Festival.

Sports 

 27 – 29 September – The IV World Rhythmic Gymnastics Championships were held in Varna, Bulgaria.

References 

 
1960s in Bulgaria
Years of the 20th century in Bulgaria
Bulgaria
Bulgaria